This family represents a rotavirus cis-acting replication element (CRE) found at the 3'-end of rotavirus mRNAs. The family is thought to promote the synthesis of minus strand RNA to form viral dsRNA.

References

External links 
 

Cis-regulatory RNA elements